This article describes about the squads for the 2018 Copa América Femenina.

Group A

Chile
The squad was announced on 24 March 2018.

Head coach: José Letelier

Colombia
Head coach: Nelson Abadía

Paraguay
Head coach: Rubén Subeldía

Peru
The squad was announced on 28 March 2018.

Head coach: Vivian Ayres

*Diana Alfaro was originally announced in the squad by the Peruvian Football Federation, but was later withdrawn and replaced by Carmen Suárez before the start of the tournament.

Uruguay
Head coach: Ariel Longo

Group B

Argentina
Head coach: Carlos Borrello

Bolivia
The squad was announced on 31 March 2018.

Head coach: Weimar Delgado

Brazil
The squad was announced on 28 March 2018. Bruna Benites, Fabiana and Ludmila were unavailable due to injury.

Head coach: Vadão

Ecuador
Head coach: Wendy Villón

Venezuela
The squad was announced on 19 March 2018.

Head coach: José Catoya

References

Squads
2018